Carmagnola or la Carmagnola is the traditional name of a porphyry head of a late Roman emperor, widely thought to represent Justinian, now placed on the external balustrade of St Mark's Basilica in Venice.

Description
The Diadem unambiguously identifies the head as that of a late Roman emperor, and on stylistic grounds it has been dated between the 4th and 6th centuries, with several scholars identifying it as a depiction of Justinian. The flattened nose is ostensibly the result of damage and subsequent repolishing. It is "one of the most significant" of the ornamental trophies that adorn the Basilica's facade, looking straight into the direction of Constantinople.

A headless porphyry statue kept at the Archiepiscopal Museum in Ravenna has been hypothesized to belong to the same original.

History
The head may come from the Philadelphion in Constantinople, the original location of the Portrait of the Four Tetrarchs that is now just below on the Basilica's Piazzetta facade. It was "almost certainly" brought to Venice as part of the loot from the Sack of Constantinople during the Fourth Crusade in 1204 CE.

The condottiere Francesco Bussone da Carmagnola was beheaded on 5 May 1432 on the Piazzetta, where his head was presumably left exposed for some time, leading to the sculpture's traditional nickname.

References

6th-century sculptures
Busts in Italy
Byzantine sculpture
Constantinople
Justinian I
Roman sculpture portraits of emperors
Stone sculptures in Italy
Works looted by the Fourth Crusade